The RWD 7 was a Polish sports plane of 1931, constructed by the RWD team.

Development
The RWD 7 was constructed by the RWD team of Stanisław Rogalski, Stanisław Wigura and Jerzy Drzewiecki in Warsaw. It was based upon their earlier designs, especially the RWD 2 and RWD 4. The RWD 7 was meant to be a record-beating plane, so it had a more powerful engine, while its mass was reduced. From its predecessors, it took the same fish-shaped fuselage without a direct view towards forward from the pilot's seat.

The only RWD 7 built (registration SP-AGH) was flown in July  1931 by its designer Jerzy Drzewiecki. On August 12, 1931, Drzewiecki and Jerzy Wędrychowski established an international FAI speed record of 178 km/h (111 mph) in the light touring plane class, (below 280 kg / 616 lb empty weight). On September 30, 1932, Drzewiecki and Antoni Kocjan set a height record of 6,023 m (19,755 ft). The RWD 7 was used in Warsaw Aero Club, among others, for aerobatics, then in 1936 it was bought by a known aviator Zbigniew Babiński for touring flights and used until 1938.

The RWD 7 was known for its extremely short take-off run: with a single crew member only 18 m (59 ft), with two crew members, 30 m (98 ft).

Description
The RWD 7 was a wooden construction, conventional in layout, high-wing cantilever monoplane. The fuselage was rectangular in cross-section (narrowing in upper part), plywood-covered, apart from the engine section, which was aluminium sheet-covered. The wings were trapezoid, single-spar, single part, canvas and plywood covered. A crew of two was sitting in tandem, with a pilot in the rear cab. The crew cabs were open on upper sides, and had doors on the right side. The engine was 5-cylinder Armstrong Siddeley Genet II radial engine, 56 kW (75 hp) nominal power. Two-blade wooden propeller of a fixed pitch. The plane had a conventional landing gear, with a rear skid. A 30 L fuel tank was in central part of wing. A cruise fuel consumption was 18 L/hour.

Specifications

See also

References

RWD 07
RWD 07
Single-engined tractor aircraft
High-wing aircraft
Aircraft first flown in 1931